Stone County is the name of several counties in the United States:

Stone County, Arkansas
Stone County, Mississippi
Stone County, Missouri